Nine Mile Road can mean:
Nine Mile Road (Virginia), a road in and near Richmond, Virginia
9 Mile Road (Michigan), a road in the Mile Road System (Detroit)
Nine Mile Road, a segment of U.S. Route 90 Alternate and State Road 10 near Pensacola, Florida